Ruyigi is a city located in eastern Burundi. It is the capital city of Ruyigi Province.

References

Populated places in Burundi